"Gigolo" is a single by English rock band the Damned, released on 23 January 1987 by MCA Records.

The single was released in a bewildering array of 7" variants - copies were pressed on standard black vinyl, green vinyl, blue vinyl, red vinyl and yellow vinyl, and the coloured versions also included a poster sleeve. "Gigolo" was substantially edited from the album version, with around two minutes of the introduction excised for single release.

The introduction to the song was closely derived from the song "Gigolo Aunt" by Syd Barrett, which is also referenced in the lyric.

A promotional clip directed by Gerard de Thame helped the single reach No. 29.

MCA also issued the single in Australia, Germany, Italy and Spain.

The B-side instrumental track "The Portrait" was used in the episode "A Womb with a View" of the television series Moonlighting. The extended version of "The Portrait" (on the 12" single) contained a sample of the Bernard Herrmann-penned untitled theme song from the film Portrait of Jennie (1948).

Track listing
 "Gigolo" (Jugg, Scabies, Vanian, Merrick) - 3:59
 "The Portrait" (Jugg, Scabies, Vanian, Merrick) - 3:50

12" single

 "Gigolo (Extended Version)" (Jugg, Scabies, Vanian, Merrick) - 4:45
"The Portrait (Extended Version)" (Jugg, Scabies, Vanian, Merrick) - 4:41

Production credits
 Producer:
 Jon Kelly
 Musicians:
 Dave Vanian − vocals
 Rat Scabies − drums
 Roman Jugg − guitar, keyboards
 Bryn Merrick − bass
 Kurt Holmes – trumpet on "Gigolo"

External links

1987 singles
The Damned (band) songs
Songs written by Rat Scabies
Songs written by Roman Jugg
Songs written by David Vanian
Songs written by Bryn Merrick
British new wave songs
1986 songs